Blastomonas aquatica  is a Gram-negative, bacteriochlorophyll-containing and aerobic bacteria from the genus of Blastomonas which has been isolated from the Lake Peng Co and the Lake Namtso from the Tibetan Plateau in China.

References 

Sphingomonadales
Bacteria described in 2015